The Division of Shortland is an Australian electoral division in the state of New South Wales.

Geography
Since 1984, federal electoral division boundaries in Australia have been determined at redistributions by a redistribution committee appointed by the Australian Electoral Commission. Redistributions occur for the boundaries of divisions in a particular state, and they occur every seven years, or sooner if a state's representation entitlement changes or when divisions of a state are malapportioned.

History

The division is named after Lt John Shortland, an early European explorer of the Hunter Region, and was proclaimed at the redistribution of 11 May 1949, and was first contested at the 1949 federal election.

Much of the western boundary is formed by Lake Macquarie. Shortland covers an area from Highfields, Cardiff and Boolaroo in the north to Budgewoi and San Remo in the south.

The current Member for Shortland, since the 2016 federal election, is Pat Conroy, a member of the Australian Labor Party.

The seat has been held by Labor since its creation; like most seats in the Hunter Region, it has usually been reasonably safe for that party.

Members

Election results

References

External links
 Division of Shortland - Australian Electoral Commission

Electoral divisions of Australia
Constituencies established in 1949
1949 establishments in Australia